Chelis ferghana is a moth in the family Erebidae. It was described by Otto Staudinger in 1887. It is found in Central Asia (Alai, Sussamyr, Turkestan Range, possibly the Pamirs, and Tien Shan), Afghanistan and possibly Nepal.

This species, along with the others of the genus Palearctia, was moved to Chelis as a result of phylogenetic research published by Rönkä et al. in 2016.

Subspecies
 Chelis ferghana ferghana (Alai Mountains)
 Chelis ferghana schottlaenderi (Strand, 1912) (Tien Shan)
 Chelis ferghana sussamyra Dubatolov, 1996 (Suusamyr Mountains)

References

Moths described in 1887
Arctiina